Kathleen M. Carley is an American computational social scientist specializing in dynamic network analysis. She is a professor in the School of Computer Science in the Carnegie Mellon Institute for Software Research at Carnegie Mellon University and also holds appointments in the Tepper School of Business, the Heinz College, the Department of Engineering and Public Policy, and the Department of Social and Decision Sciences.

Background
Kathleen Carley was born in Pueblo, Colorado in 1956. At High School her interest in social modeling was inspired by Isaac Asimov's Foundation series. Artificial intelligence was not a career path at that time and she was dissuaded from studying Mathematics because of gender stereotyping.
Instead she studied for an S.B. in economics and an S.B. in political science from the Massachusetts Institute of Technology in 1978. She received her Ph.D. in sociology from Harvard University in 1984.  Her Ph.D. advisor was Harrison White and her thesis was entitled Consensus Construction.

Career
On leaving Harvard in 1984, Carley secured a position as Associate Professor of Sociology and Information Systems at Carnegie Mellon University where she remains based. In 1990 she became Associate Professor of Sociology and Organizations, in 1998 Professor of Sociology, Organizations and IT, and in 2002 attained her current role as Professor of Computation, Organization and Society. Since 1998 she has also held appointments in other CMU schools and departments; the Department of Social and Decision Sciences, Heinz College, Tepper School of Business and Department of Engineering and Public Policy.

Research
Carley's research combines cognitive science, sociology and computer science to address complex social and organizational problems.  Methodologically she applies network science, machine learning, natural language processing, and agent based modeling to high-dimensional, large, and dynamic data. Her most notable research contribution was the establishment of dynamic network analysis (DNA) and the establishment of social cybersecurity. She has also contributed to research on computational social and organization theory, adaptation and evolution, text mining, and the impact of telecommunication technologies and policy on communication, information diffusion, disease contagion and response within and among groups particularly in disaster or crisis situations, and dynamic network methods.

She is the director of the Center for Computational Analysis of Social and Organizational Systems, a university-wide interdisciplinary center that brings together network science, computer science, and organizational studies and is the director of the center for Informed Democracy and Social-cybersecurity (IDeaS) at CMU.

Carley is the founding co-editor and co-editor-in-chief of the journal Computational and Mathematical Organization Theory. She has co-edited several books in the computational organizations and dynamic network area.

See also
 Dynamic network analysis

References

External links
Carnegie Mellon - Kathleen Carley

Carnegie Mellon University faculty
Harvard Graduate School of Arts and Sciences alumni
MIT School of Humanities, Arts, and Social Sciences alumni
American systems scientists
Living people
1956 births
American women sociologists
American sociologists
Women systems scientists
Network scientists
20th-century social scientists
20th-century American scientists
20th-century American women scientists
21st-century social scientists
21st-century American scientists
21st-century American women scientists
Scientists from Colorado
People from Pueblo, Colorado